The Park Road East drill hall is a former military installation in Wolverhampton.

History
The drill hall was designed as the drill hall for 'D' Squadron of the Staffordshire Yeomanry and the 4th (Staffordshire) Battery, Royal Field Artillery and opened on 1 July 1911. With the formation of the Territorial Force in 1908, the drill hall became the home of the 3rd North Midland Brigade, Royal Field Artillery. The brigade was mobilised at the drill hall in August 1914 and, after being deployed to France and being re-designated 232 Brigade in May 1916, it saw action at the attack on the Gommecourt Salient in July 1916. After the war both 'D' Squadron of the Staffordshire Yeomanry and 232 Brigade were disbanded; the drill hall was decommissioned and converted into residential apartments in 2002.

References

Drill halls in England
Buildings and structures in Wolverhampton